Paragraphia is a condition which results in the use of unintended letters or phonemes, words or syllables when writing. This is typically an acquired disorder derived from brain damage and it results in a diminished ability to effectively use written expression.

Paragraphias can be classified as function of the type of writing errors:  literal paragraphias, graphemic paragraphias and morphemic paragraphias.

References

Diseases and disorders